Leanne Walker (born 17 July 1968) is a New Zealand former basketball player who competed in the 2000 Summer Olympics and in the 2004 Summer Olympics. Walker also competed for New Zealand at the 1994 World Championship held in Australia.

References

1968 births
Living people
New Zealand women's basketball players
Olympic basketball players of New Zealand
Basketball players at the 2000 Summer Olympics
Basketball players at the 2004 Summer Olympics